Karl Sigmund Stromberg is a fictional character and the main antagonist in the 1977 James Bond film The Spy Who Loved Me. Stromberg was portrayed by Curd Jürgens. The character Stromberg was created specifically for the film by writer Christopher Wood. Ian Fleming's novel The Spy Who Loved Me was not told from Bond's perspective, but, rather, a Bond girl who is in love with him. The entire plot of the film has actually nothing to do at all with the plot of the novel. This was at Fleming's request; when he sold the rights to his novel to Eon Productions he requested only the title be used.

Biography

The webbed-fingered Karl Stromberg is a successful self-employed businessman as head of his own shipping firm and chain of laboratories. Stromberg's obsession and passion is the ocean where he lives in his palace, named Atlantis, that could submerge itself underwater so as not to be seen or detected. Located off the coast of Sardinia, Italy, Atlantis has everything to support life above and below water for any length of time. In fact, Atlantis is more like a city, able to support dozens if not hundreds of people. Stromberg also owns a huge tanker, named Liparus, that serves as his headquarters away from Atlantis. Aboard the tanker he has a small army of red soldiers. In Christopher Wood's novelisation of the film, Stromberg is Swedish and his first name is "Sigmund".

Scheme
Although Stromberg has a passion for the ocean and its various species, he despises the human race, not unlike Jules Verne's Captain Nemo. Stromberg, however, is much more diabolical and has no interest in benefiting the world. He has a congenital condition in which his hands are webbed like those of aquatic birds or mammals. It is his personal mission to start over with a new civilisation underwater via complete anarchy against the "surface world". After contracting two scientists to create the technology to track nuclear submarines, Stromberg uses this technology to capture a Soviet nuclear submarine and a British submarine. By tracking the subs, Stromberg's specially adapted tanker, Liparus, sneaks up on the subs, forces them to the surface through methods using some kind of high frequencies to disrupt the sub's electrical system and captures them inside the tanker. His plan calls for the firing of nuclear missiles from these subs at Moscow and New York City, thus framing each other's government and starting a nuclear war, which would wipe out every last human being on Earth. Among Stromberg's many minions were an assistant who betrayed him by trying to sell the plans for the submarine tracking system, and a professor and a doctor who were to help him operate the tracking system after it was complete. He killed his assistant by feeding her to a shark, and killed the professor and the doctor, having outlived their usefulness, by blowing up their helicopter. (In a comic relief after cancelling the payment to the professor and doctor he has his secretary inform the two men's families that they have met with an accident and are "buried at sea".)

This scheme is similar to that of an earlier Bond film, You Only Live Twice, which posited stealing space capsules to start a war between the Soviets and the Americans. The idea of commandeering two nuclear missiles and attempting to fire them at two major cities likewise recalls the plot of Thunderball. The scheme in which the villain wishes to destroy mankind to create a new race or new civilisation was also used in Moonraker, the next film after The Spy Who Loved Me. In Moonraker, the villain Hugo Drax has an obsession with restarting human civilisation in outer space, although Drax's plans were to eventually return to Earth, unlike Stromberg. The film Moonraker was also written by Christopher Wood. Both Stromberg and Drax have hired Jaws as a henchman.

Prevention
Stromberg's scheme is foiled after Bond is taken aboard the Liparus as a prisoner from a recently captured American submarine. With Bond's help, the crews from the submarines escape and take over the tanker. With the tanker under their control, Bond is able to order the stolen submarines, which were crewed by Stromberg's men, to fire their nuclear warheads at each other. Prior to this, however, Stromberg had abducted Bond's partner, the Russian agent Anya Amasova, and escaped to his city-ship, Atlantis.

Bond pursues Stromberg, and after two failed attempts by Stromberg to kill him (including the use of an explosive harpoon which ran the length of a dinner table), Bond exercises his licence to kill by shooting Stromberg multiple times in the groin and chest. Atlantis is later torpedoed and sunk, giving Stromberg a burial at sea.

Henchmen
 Jaws - survived
 Naomi - blown up by Bond
 Sandor - thrown off the edge of a building by Bond
 Liparus Captain - fatally wounded by an explosion
 Professor Markowitz - blown up in helicopter explosion
 Dr. Bechmann - blown up in helicopter explosion
 Kate Chapman - eaten by shark
 Captain, Stromberg 1 (formerly Soviet submarine Potemkin) - nuked, along with his entire crew, by Stromberg 2
 Captain, Stromberg 2 (formerly British submarine HMS Ranger) - nuked, along with his entire crew, by Stromberg 1
 Motorbike Henchman - blinded and sent off a cliff
 Three Men in Jaws' car - all killed in car crash
 A large army of red soldiers

See also
List of James Bond villains
James Bond in film

References

Bond villains
Fictional German people
Fictional Swedish people
James Bond characters
Fictional businesspeople
Fictional dictators
Fictional warlords
The Spy Who Loved Me (film)
Film characters introduced in 1977
Fictional terrorists
Male literary villains
Male film villains
Action film villains
Film supervillains